United Pasok Momogun Organisation (abbrev:Pasok Momogun or UPMO) is an ethnically-based political party in North Borneo (later Sabah, Malaysia).  It was a splinter party of United National Kadazan Organisation (UNKO); founded by Donald Stephens earlier in 1961. The breakaway UPMO formed by Orang Kaya Kaya (OKK) Datuk G.S. Sundang, in January 1962 to fight for the interest of Kadazan-Dusun-Murut (KDM) races; with the supports and encouragement of the Chinese in Sabah. The split was in reaction and protest to the suggestion of the Prime Minister of Malaya, Tunku Abdul Rahman to create a new federation country named Malaysia, dubbed Projek Malaysia.

In May 1964, UPMO eventually reunited with its parent party UNKO which had earlier entered into a coalition with the United Sabah National Organisation (USNO) and the Sabah Chinese Association (SCA) to form a new consociationalism Government of Sabah with Stephens became the state's first Chief Minister, upon the successful formation of Malaysia in 1963,. With the reunification of UPMO back into UNKO had renamed itself as United Pasokmomogun Kadazan Organisation (UPKO) in June 1964.

General election results

See also
Politics of Malaysia
List of political parties in Malaysia
United Pasokmomogun Kadazan Organisation (UPKO) (Old)

References

External links 
 

Defunct political parties in Sabah
1962 establishments in North Borneo
Political parties established in 1962
1964 disestablishments in Malaysia
Political parties disestablished in 1964
Indigenist political parties
Ethnic political parties